The Southern Muya Range is a mountain range in Buryatia and Zabaykalsky Krai, Russia, part of the Stanovoy Highlands. The highest point of the range is 3,067 m high Muisky Gigant; another important peak is 2363 m high Mount Shaman.

Geography
This mountain range is located in the Baikal Rift Zone, in the southwestern part of the Baikal-Stanovoy Region. It stretches from west to east for almost 400 km from the Barguzin river basin to the upper course of the Chara River. In its eastern part it reaches a maximum width of 80 km. The Ikat Range connects with it from the southwest. The Southern Muya Range is limited by the Muya-Kuanda Depression in the north, by the Baunt Depression in the south and in the east by the Bambuyka and Vitim rivers.

Hydrography
Rivers Pravaya Shurinda and Dyaltukta, right tributaries of the Muya originate from the northwestern slopes of the axial or main Southern Muya Range. Lake Dorong is located at the southwestern end.

Flora
The slopes of the range are mainly covered with mountain taiga, with pre-alpine woodland and bare summits (golets) at higher elevations.

See also
List of mountains and hills of Russia
Northern Muya Range

References

External links

Stanovoy Highlands
Mountain ranges of Russia
Mountains of Buryatia
Mountains of Zabaykalsky Krai